Longmatan District is a district of the city of Luzhou, Sichuan Province, China.

See also
Luzhou

References

External links
Longmatan District Government website

Districts of Sichuan
Luzhou